The 2020–21 Lietuvos krepšinio lyga, also called Betsafe-LKL for sponsorship reasons, was the 28th season of the top-tier level professional basketball league of Lithuania, the Lietuvos krepšinio lyga (LKL). Žalgiris achieved their 23rd title overall, eleven consecutive.

Competition format
During the regular season, all teams play 36 games. The top eight teams in the regular season standings, after playing their entire 36 game schedule, qualified for the playoffs in the quarterfinals, that was played in a best-of-three games format. The semifinals were played in best-of-three format.

The final round was played between the two winners of the semifinals. The finals series, for first place, as also games for third place were played in a best-of-five format.

Notable events
 On 30 September 2020, the LKL has reached a historic agreement - LKL will be broadcast in foreign countries for the first time since its establishment.
 On 9 October 2020, the LKL decided that the match between Žalgiris and Nevėžis-Optibet on 11 October 2020 and the match between Juventus and Alytus Dzūkija on 10 October 2020 are postponed.
 On 27 October 2020, the LKL Board has decided how to deal with the spread of COVID-19 infection and how the LKL championship matches will take place. The minimum number of players in a team in order to play a match is 8 players, if there is no such number of players in the team, the match will be suspended and postponed to the next date.
 On 27 April 2021, the LKL board decided that 11 teams will participate in the tournament for the next 2021-22 LKL season. Next season, a team from NKL Cbet Jonava, which won the NKL title this year, will join LKL. The team that will take last place this season will not relegate to NKL.
 On 7 June 2021, the last match of the Betsafe-LKL final series took place. Žalgiris won the Betsafe-LKL title, it is already the 23rd Žalgiris title and the 11th consecutive title.

Teams

Location and arenas

Ten teams were granted licences for the 2020–21 LKL season.

Managerial changes

Regular season

League table

Results

Play–offs

Quarterfinals will be played in a best–of–three games format, while semifinals and the finals in a best–of–five format.

Bracket

Lithuanian clubs in European competitions

Awards
All official awards of the 2020–21 LKL season.

Regular Season MVP

LKL Finals MVP

Other awards

Best coach of the season

All-LKL Teams

Source:

Player of the month

Statistics

Individual statistics

Rating

Source: LKL.LT

Points

Source: LKL.LT

Rebounds

Source: LKL.LT

Assists

Source: LKL.LT

Other statistics

Source: LKL.LT

Individual game highs

Source: LKL.LT

Team statistics

Source: LKL.LT

Sponsors

References

External links
 LKL website

 
Lietuvos krepšinio lyga seasons
Lithuanian
LKL
2021 in Lithuanian sport
2020 in Lithuanian sport